The Sunzha is a river in North Ossetia, Ingushetia and Chechnya, Russia, a tributary of the Terek. It flows northeast inside the great northwest bend of the Terek River and catches most of the rivers that flow north from the mountains before they reach the Terek. The Sunzha rises on the Northern slope of the Caucasus Major. Its major tributaries are the Assa and Argun. It is used for irrigation. Cities that lie on the Sunzha include Nazran, Karabulak, Grozny (the capital of Chechnya), and Gudermes. During the First and Second Chechen Wars, the destruction of petroleum reservoirs caused the Sunzha to become polluted with petroleum.

Nomenclature
The origin of the name of the river is disputed. The most probable of versions name Sunzha has come from Mongol-Turkic languages in the deformed type. It is known that Mongols called it Suinchie, Russians Sevenz and in the Chechen language its name got corrective type Solchzha.

There is also other version that before Sunzha Chechens called the river Okhi «Oh'-hi, Оhhи» that means «downwards the river».

See also
Valerik (river) – historically notable tributary of Sunzha

References

Rivers of North Ossetia–Alania
Rivers of Ingushetia
Rivers of Chechnya